Raven in the Grave is the fifth studio album by The Raveonettes, and was released on 4 April 2011. Several of the songs included on the album are English re-recordings of songs found on Wagner's solo album.

Reception

The album received generally positive reviews upon its release. At Metacritic, which assigns a normalised rating out of 100 to reviews from mainstream critics, the album received an average score of 66, based on 18 reviews, which indicates "Generally favorable reviews".

Since its release, Sune Rose Wagner has expressed disappointment with the album, stating it would have worked better as a soundtrack and that the song structures are "quite unusual compared to everything else [The Raveonettes have] done".

Track listing

References

2011 albums
The Raveonettes albums
Vice Records albums